Ilija Đukić (January 4, 1930 in Novi Rujac – October 22, 2002 in Belgrade) was a Serbian diplomat who held the post of Foreign Minister for the Federal Republic of Yugoslavia.

Career
Đukić attended the Institute for Political Sciences in Beijing, China graduating in 1959.  
The Yugoslav foreign service proceeded to give him a succession of posts in the Far East, until he was moved to Eastern Europe and Moscow in the 1970s and 1980s.  
In 1990, he again returned to Beijing, now as an Ambassador.

From 1992 to 1993, he was serving as the Foreign Minister of Yugoslavia.

His final post was as the Yugoslav Ambassador to China from 2000 to 2002.

References

External links
Ilija Djukic biography at Republic of Serbia Ministry of Foreign Affairs

1930 births
2002 deaths
Ambassadors of Yugoslavia to Bulgaria
Ambassadors of Yugoslavia to China
Foreign ministers of Yugoslavia